Scantraxx is a Dutch record label founded by Dov Elkabas in 2002, specializing in hardstyle music.

S.W.A.T 
Between November 2007 and April 2008, the label organized a number of shows under the name of S.W.A.T (Scantraxx World Artist Tour) in Europe and Australia. Those events were repeated in 2009 and 2010, but only in Europe.

Sublabels

Active 
 Scantraxx BLACK (Sublabel for Rawstyle)
 Scantraxx CARBON (Talents in Rawstyle) 
 Scantraxx Evolutionz (Sublabel of D-Block & S-te-Fan)
 Scantraxx Global
 Scantraxx Silver (Talents)
 Scantraxx Special
 Scantraxx Prospexx

Inactive 
 A² Records (Sublabel of Alpha², replaced by Scantraxx BLACK)
 Gold Records (formerly TiLLT Gold; Sublabel of Max Enforcer)
 M!D!FY (Sublabel of Brennan Heart; as well as M!D!FY Digital)
 Paint It Black
 Scantraxx Italy (Sublabel of Davide Sonar)
 Scantraxx Reloaded (Sublabel of Headhunterz)
 ScantraXXL
 Squaretraxx (Sublabel of Ruthless)
 Unleashed Records (Sublabel of Digital Punk)
 X-Bone (former talent label)
 X-Raw (former RAW talent label)

Artists

Currently

Scantraxx 
 Adrenalize
 Bass Modulators (previously on Art of Creation)
 Demi Kanon
 Devin Wild
 DJ Isaac
 Envine
 JDX (previously own label JDX Music; later founded the label PL4N3T X)
 Keltek
 Lady Faith
 Level One
 The Prophet
 Zatox (previously on Dirty Workz, own the label Italian Hardstyle from Scantraxx Italy)

Scantraxx BLACK 
 D-Attack
 Imperial
 Imperatorz
 Kronos
 Neroz (previously on Heart on Hard Records)

Scantraxx CARBON 
 Crossfight
 Deluzion
 Nightcraft
 Revive
 Rogue Zero

Scantraxx Evolutionz 
 D-Block & S-te-Fan
 Ghost Stories

Scantraxx Global 
 Arioze
 Illuminize

Scantraxx Silver 
 D-Charged
 Enemy Contact
 Envine
 Nick Novity
 Proto Bytez
 Retrospect
 Scabtik
 Solstice

Scantraxx Prospexx 
 RWND
 LYNX

Former / Inactive 
 2-Sidez (project of B-Front & DJ Pulse)
 Adaro (Roughstate)
 A-lusion (Lussive Music)
 The Anarchist (inactive)
 ANDY SVGE (I Am Hardstyle)
 Arkaine (inactive)
 Artic (inactive)
 Airtunes (now Broken Element)
 Audiofreq (own label Audiophetamine)
 Audiotricz (Art of Creation, now I Am Hardstyle)
 Atmozfears 
 Beat Providers (E-Force & Roy van Schie; inactive)
 Bioweapon (Code Black & Audiofreq; currently active)
 Black Identity (inactive Project of The Prophet & JDX)
 Blademasterz (now Brennan Heart)
 BMBSQD (inactive)
 Brennan Heart (own label WE R, now I Am Hardstyle)
 Brennan & Heart (formerly Brennan Heart & DJ Thera)
 Charger
 Clive King
 Davide Sonar (inactive)
 Dirk-Jan DJ (now DJ Duro)
 Deetox (inactive)
 DJ Duro (50% of Showtek, solo act inactive)
 Dopeman (inactive project of The Prophet)
 Energyzed (alias resigned)
 E-Force (End of Line Recordings)
 F8trix (inactive)
 Festuca (now Jesse Jax)
 Frontliner (own label Keep It Up Music)
 Gunz for Hire (project of Adaro & Ran-D, now Roughstate)
 Gostosa (Gostosa was the face, Headhunterz produced the music)
 Hardheadz (inactive project of The Prophet & Pavo)
 Headhunterz (Art of Creation)
 Headliner (now Showtek)
 Herculez On Dope
 JNXD (pronounced Jinxed; Dirty Workz)
 Krusaders (inactive)
 Max B. Grant (ETX Records)
 Max Enforcer (Lose Control Music)
 Outsiders (inactive project of Wildstylez & Alpha²)
 Pavo (inactive)
 Pherato (Dirty Workz)
 Project One (project of Headhunterz & Wildstylez, own Label Art of Creation)
 Ran-D (Roughstate)
 Requiem
 Ruthless (Be Yourself Music, now FVCK GENRES)
 RVAGE (Minus Is More)
 S-Dee (inactive)
 Scope DJ (inactive)
 SMD (50% of Noisecontrollers, solo project inactive)
 Second Identity (inactive project of A-lusion & Scope DJ)
 Seizure (inactive project of Wildstylez & Ruben Hooyer)
 Shockerz (now Aftershock)
 Stephanie
 Supaboyz (now Zatox)
 Sylenth & Glitch (inactive project of A-lusion & Jones)
 Taq 9 (inactive project of The Prophet & DJ Gizmo)
 The Masochist (inactive project of The Prophet)
 The R3belz (inactive)
 Unknown Analoq (now Brennan Heart)
 Wasted Penguinz (Dirty Workz)
 Waveliner (inactive)
 Waverider (now ANDY SVGE)
 Wildstylez (own label Lose Control Music, now Art of Creation)

References

External links
 Scantraxx on Discogs
 Scantraxx Records Official Website

Dutch record labels
Electronic dance music record labels